Tawfiq Abu Bakar Titingan (2 October 1963 – 14 March 2018) was a Malaysian politician who served on the Sabah State Legislative Assembly representing Apas. He died of colon cancer at the Prince Court Medical Centre in Kuala Lumpur on 14 March 2018, aged 55.

References 

1963 births
2018 deaths
Deaths from colorectal cancer
Deaths from cancer in Malaysia
Members of the Sabah State Legislative Assembly
People from Sabah